Zulema L'Astròloga' (after 1229), was a Moorish astronomer and astrologer.

Life
She was the mother of Alí de la Palomera, who betrayed his people by assisting James I of Aragon in the conquest of Majorca.

Zulema L'Astròloga was described by her son  Alí as a renowned astronomer. After the conquest, she and her family were allowed to remain on the island.

Tradition has recorded anecdotes about her. The medieval tower of Sant Elm at Andratx is said to have been the tower from which she watched the stars.

Zulema L'Astròloga is mentioned in the contemporary account by the Catalan chronicler Bernard Desclot, and the subject of the poem  (published in 1871) by the Spanish polymath , as well as in a poem by the Catalan philologist .

References

Further reading
 

1190 births
13th-century deaths
13th-century people from al-Andalus
13th-century astronomers
Medieval women scientists
Astronomers from al-Andalus
13th-century people from the Kingdom of Aragon
Women from al-Andalus
Astronomers of the medieval Islamic world